Antoni Torres García (29 July 1943 – 24 February 2003) was a Spanish footballer. He was active during the 1960s and 1970s, and was officially recognized as a legendary player for FC Barcelona. He was born on 29 July 1943 in Balaguer, Lerida, Spain. He died of cancer in Barcelona on 24 February 2003, at the age of 59.

FC Barcelona
Born in Balaguer, Lleida, Catalonia, Torres spent most of his career at FC Barcelona, playing 479 games as a starter between 1965 and 1976. He mainly played as a traditional defender or a libero.

Before signing for Barcelona, Torres played for Hercules de Alicante, where he established himself as a central defender. In the 1964–65 season he received the award for the best footballer of the Spanish League. After three years at Barcelona he found his way in to the national team, and earned five caps with le selecíon between 1968 and 1969.

He retired at end of the 1975–1976 season. On 1 September 1976, he received a tribute organized by FC Barcelona, along with his teammates Joaquim Rifé, and Salvador Sadurní.

After retiring, he took the up coaching. In 1984, he founded a football youth school in Barcelona, TARR Escuela, which is named after the initials of its four founders, all  former players of Barcelona: Torres, Asensi, Rexach and Rifé.

Honours 
 1 Inter-Cities Fairs Cup: 1965–1966.
 2 Copa del Rey: 1967–1968, 1970–1971
 1 Liga: 1973–1974

References

External links
 
 
 
 

1943 births
2003 deaths
People from Noguera (comarca)
Sportspeople from the Province of Lleida
Spanish footballers
Association football defenders
La Liga players
CF Balaguer footballers
FC Barcelona players
Hércules CF players
Spain amateur international footballers
Spain international footballers
Spanish football managers
La Liga managers
FC Barcelona Atlètic managers
CD Castellón managers
Hércules CF managers
Catalonia international footballers